The Samsung YP-S3 (or simply Samsung S3) is an MP3 player produced and manufactured by Samsung Electronics released in 2008.

File Support
The Samsung YP-S3 supports MP3, WMA, MPEG4, Ogg, SVI, JPEG, and TXT.

Features
The Samsung YP-S3 has several features. It has:
 FM Radio
 FM Radio Recording
 DNSe 2.0 Sound Engine
 Picture Viewer
 Text Viewer
 Video player
 Games
 Podcasting

Tools & Other Features
 Alarm Clock
 Album Art
 Wallpaper
 Screen Saver
 Clock

File Management, Battery & Storage
MP3 Files in the Samsung S3 are managed through albums, songs, artists, and genre. A favorites list is an option.

Applications
The S3's Applications include Music, Videos, Prime Pack, Settings, Data Casts, FM Radio, Pictures, and a File Browser.

Storage Space
The Samsung YP-S3 contains either 2GB, 4GB or 8GB of storage space.

Battery life
Samsung claims up to 25 hours of music playback (with MP3 128kbit/s files and volume 15/30) and 4 hours of video playback.

See also
 Samsung Electronics
 Samsung YEPP

References

External links
 Samsung Website US

Portable media players
Computer-related introductions in 2008